Fazail is a surname. Notable people with the surname include:

Mohd Irfan Fazail (born 1991), Malaysian footballer
Mohd Afiq Fazail (born 1994), Malaysian footballer, brother of Mohd Irfan

Urdu-language surnames